Deda may refer to:

 Deda (ethnic slur), a derogatory slur for Bengali Hindus in Bangladesh
 Deda, Romania
 Deda, Albanian surname
 Eltar Deda, Albanian politician
 Deda, Ukrainian surname
 Myroslav Deda, Ukrainian footballer
 Yaroslav Deda, Ukrainian footballer
 Deda, American rapper; see Lost & Found: Hip Hop Underground Soul Classics#Deda The Original Baby Pa